Abronia taeniata, the banded arboreal alligator lizard or bromeliad arboreal alligator lizard, is a vulnerable species of arboreal alligator lizard described in 1828 by Arend Friedrich August Wiegmann.

References

Abronia
Reptiles described in 1828